There are two species of lizard named small-scaled desert lizard:

 Meroles micropholidotus
 Mesalina microlepis

Reptile common names
Lacertidae